Shoulder surfing may refer to:

 Shoulder surfing (computer security)
 Shoulder surfing (surfing)